One for My Baby is an album by pianist George Cables recorded in 2000 and released on the Danish label, SteepleChase.

Reception 

Ken Dryden of AllMusic stated "George Cables draws from a variety of standards and jazz compositions by well-known composers for this 2000 trio date".

Track listing 
 "Drop Me Off in Harlem" (Duke Ellington) – 8:59
 "Virgo" (Wayne Shorter) – 7:33
 "My Foolish Heart" (Victor Young, Ned Washington) – 9:09
 "I Should Care" (Axel Stordahl, Sammy Cahn, Paul Weston) – 9:20
 "Capricious" (Billy Taylor) – 5:47
 "Emily" (Johnny Mandel, Johnny Mercer) – 6:43
 "Anna Maria" (Shorter) – 9:00
 "One for My Baby" (Harold Arlen, Johnny Mercer) – 10:04

Personnel 
George Cables – piano
Jay Anderson – bass
Yoron Israel – drums

References 

George Cables albums
2000 albums
SteepleChase Records albums